'Valentina Acava is a writer, educator and artivist. She is an outspoken advocate to end female genital mutilation (FGM) using artistic and educational Workshops. She was born into Italian and Greek parents and was raised in South Africa. She is the founder of Creative Encounters, an artistic platform for artists in East Africa.

She started her career as a journalist corresponding from different African countries. She has published 11 books, including children's books, novels, and poetry. Io... donna... immigrata... (I...immigrant...woman...) is a play that has been staged in Italy, France, Congo, Kenya, South Africa.  The Cut is the final work produced out of the Gugu Women Lab, a collective of women from South Africa and other African countries founded in Cape Town in 2011. It is based on the true experience of some of the participants who have undergone female genital mutilation. The performance has been on stage in 2013 in Italy and in the early days of 2014 received the sponsorship of Amnesty International Italia for its value in promoting awareness on female genital mutilation using art.

A selection of her stories was published in 2013 on the 2nd issue of Italian Studies of Southern Africa Journal (UNISA - Pretoria 2013).

She has represented South Africa, along with other writers from the Africa Continent, at the International Grinzane Cavour Meeting "Il deserto e dopo. La letteratura africana dall’oralità alla parola scritta” in 2007.

Her novel Cercando Lindiwe was chosen by Prof. Antonella Piazza of the Department of Italian Studies of UNISA-Pretoria for her comparatistic work: "The issue of Identity in Cercando Lindiwe by Valentina Acava Mmaka and If This Is a Man by Primo Levi" which was presented for the first time in occasion of the 1st Colloquium of Italian Studies at UNISA/Pretoria in September 2011.

She is the founder of the Social Change Program Invisible Cities which aims to upgrade marginalized neighborhoods using art to make impact and create social change.

She has nearly 20 years of experience working with immigrants, refugees and asylum seekers in different countries.

She speaks at international meetings, universities, and conferences.

Her monologue "Farida" has been published in the collection Time to say NO, edited by Philo Ikonya and Helmuth Niederle by Austrian PEN Club.

Publications

Children's books
Il mondo a colori della famiglia BwanaVal (Kabiliana 2002)
Jabuni  il mistero della città sommersa (EMI 2003) 
I nomi della Pace Amani (EMI 2004)
Le Fantastiche Storie di Ortensia (KabilianaPress 2016)
La Storia di Selma (KabilianaPress 2016)

Novels
Cercando Lindiwe (Epoché 2007- KabilianaPress 2014) 
 Il Viaggio Capovolto (Epoché 2010)

Theatre
 Io...donna...immigrata... volere dire scrivere (EMI 2004) 
 I ... immigrant... woman...  (2017)
 The Cut (2016)

Poetry
 L'Ottava Nota (Prospettiva 2002)
OUT (KabilianaPress 2016)

Essay 
 "The Cut. Voices for Change breaking Silence on Female Genital Mutilation" (2017)

Projects

In 2011, Mmaka founded in Cape Town a collective of women (South African and immigrant from other African countries) to produce a writing project on human rights. The results were the basis for her play, The Cut.

References

Official Website Valentina Acava

External links
Reflection on FGM within the Bohra Community
"Ethiopia Still Far from Eradicating FGM"
"Fighting the Scourge of FGM in Kenya"
"What media should do in the fight against FGM"
"Young Activist fights FGM in Kenya"
 "He died with shame", Pambazuka 2014
Selection of Unpublished Poems Italian Studies in Southern Africa, 2013
 Salvarsi è prendere coscienza (Corriere Immigrazione)
 Contro le Mutilazioni Genitali Femminili (Per I Diritti Umani) 2013
 "Le storie di mutilazioni genitali femminili arrivano a teatro" (Frontierenews)2014
 "The Cut, intervista" (Missionidafrica) 2013
 Intervista a Unosguardoalfemminile 2013
 Interview with Yewande Omotoso - Warscapes 2014
Interview with Sitawa Wafula
 Interview with Philo Ikonya
 Interview with Mike Nicol
 Interview with Phillippa Yaa de Villiers
 Interview with Richard Ali

Living people
Italian-language writers
Kenyan human rights activists
South African human rights activists
Year of birth missing (living people)